John Cooper (died by 1532), was an English Member of Parliament. He represented Berwick-upon-Tweed in 1529

References

Year of birth missing
1530s deaths
English MPs 1529–1536
History of Berwick-upon-Tweed